Andrzej Chwalba (born 1949 in Częstochowa) is a Polish historian. Professor of history at the Jagiellonian University (since 1995), the university's prorector of didactics (1999-2002), head of the Institute of Social and Religious History of Europe in 19th and 20th century, and the deacon and prodeacon of Department of History.

Chwalba graduated from the Jagiellonian University in 1972. Later he worked as a teacher in Częstochowa. In 1977 he became a member of the Communist party - Polish United Workers' Party. He gained a Ph.D. from the Jagiellonian University in 1982.

Chwalba is a member of the Polish Historical Society, the  Historical Commission of the  Polish Academy of Science and several foreign historical societies (Intern. Tagung der Historik, Europ. Community Liaison Committee of Historians, Centre de recherches d'histoire des mouvement sociaux et du syndicalisme), as well as editor in chief of Alternatywy (1985-1989); and Arka (1994-1995). He is a member of the editorial board of Historyka. He is also Chairman of the Organisational Committee of the Congress.

Works by Andrzej Chwalba centre on social and religious history of Europe in 19th and 20th century. He has published over 120 scientific dissertations, including several books.

Works
 Socjaliści polscy wobec kultu religijnego (1989)
 Sacrum i rewolucja (1992)
 Józef Piłsudski historyk wojskowości (1993)
 Imperium korupcji w Rosji i Królestwie Polskim w latach 1861-1917 (1995)
 Czasy "Solidarności". Francuscy związkowcy i NSZZ "S" 1980-90 (1997)
 Polacy w służbie Moskali (1999)
 Słownik Historii Polski 1939-1948 (1994,1996) - coauthor
 Kalendarium Dziejów Polski (1999) (editor)
 Samobójstwo Europy. Wielka Wojna 1914-1918 (2014)
 Przegrane zwycięstwo. Wojna polsko-bolszewicka 1918-1920 (2020)

References

 Prof. dr hab. Andrzej Chwalba contact information at UJ
UJ homepage

1949 births
Living people
People from Częstochowa
Polish United Workers' Party members
20th-century Polish historians
Polish male non-fiction writers
21st-century Polish historians
Academic staff of Jagiellonian University
Recipient of the Meritorious Activist of Culture badge